Clara Alm (born 10 September 1996) is a Swedish footballer midfielder who plays for Mallbackens IF.

External links 
 

1996 births
Living people
Swedish women's footballers
Mallbackens IF players
Damallsvenskan players
Women's association football midfielders